David Albert Alvin (born November 11, 1955) is an American singer-songwriter, guitarist and producer. He is a former and founding member of the roots rock band the Blasters. Alvin has recorded and performed as a solo artist since the late 1980s and has been involved in various side projects and collaborations. He has had brief stints as a member of the bands X and the Knitters.

Early life 
Alvin grew up in Downey, California. He and his older brother, Phil Alvin, as teenagers attended rockabilly and country music venues. Dave attended Long Beach State University.

Career

With the Blasters 
In 1979, Alvin and his brother Phil formed the roots-rock band The Blasters with fellow Downey residents Bill Bateman and John Bazz. Alvin served as the group's lead guitarist and chief songwriter. The Rough Guide to Rock noted the ever-increasing numbers of originals that Alvin wrote for the Blasters, along with his maturation into a great songwriter.

Other artists have covered Alvin's songs. For example, "Marie Marie" became a British-German top 20 hit in 1980 for Shakin' Stevens and received a zydeco treatment in 1987 from Buckwheat Zydeco. Dwight Yoakam recorded "Long White Cadillac" in 1989.

Alvin was in the original lineup until 1986. His departure reflected internal tension in the band, but ultimately he wanted to sing his own songs while his brother Phil Alvin was the established lead vocalist for the group.

Alvin has rejoined the Blasters for some reunion tours and live albums with the original lineup. He has also occasionally performed with the band under other circumstances as well.

With X and the Knitters 
Alvin served a brief stint as the lead guitarist of the Los Angeles–based alternative rock band X. He left X in 1987 to work on a solo project after the group recorded their album See How We Are.

Alvin was also a member of the country folk band The Knitters, an offshoot of X. He appeared on their 1985 album  Poor Little Critter on the Road and their 2005 follow-up, The Modern Sounds of the Knitters.

With the Flesh Eaters 
In the early 1980s, Alvin, along with fellow Blasters members Bill Bateman and Steve Berlin, performed on A Minute to Pray, A Second to Die by the Los Angeles punk band the Flesh Eaters. This lineup, which also included John Doe and D.J. Bonebrake, assembled once again in 2006, performing three shows in California and one in England to mark the album's 25th anniversary. They reunited briefly in 2015 for a five-show tour and again for an eight-show run in 2018. They issued a new album, I Used to Be Pretty, in 2019.

Solo 

Alvin's first solo album, Romeo's Escape (entitled Every Night About This Time in England), was released in 1987. It was well received by critics but did not sell well. Because of the album's low sales, Alvin's recording contract with Columbia Records was terminated. He then toured with Mojo Nixon and Country Dick Montana, billed as the Pleasure Barons; an album recorded live on their 1993 tour was released.

Alvin's second solo album, Blue Blvd, was released by Hightone Records in 1991. It received positive reviews and had moderate sales. His album Museum of Heart was released in 1993. He recorded King of California, an album of acoustic music, in 1994. In 2000, he recorded the album Public Domain: Songs From the Wild Land, a collection of traditional folk and blues classics, which earned him a Grammy award for Best Contemporary Folk Album.

In 2011, Alvin recorded the album Eleven Eleven, released by Yep Roc Records. The album marked his return to rock roots. Rolling Stone magazine, in a review of the album, called Alvin "an underrecognized guitar hero".

Further recordings with Phil Alvin 
In 2014, Dave and Phil Alvin, as a duo, released the album Common Ground, consisting of their versions of songs by Big Bill Broonzy. It was the first studio collaboration of the brothers since the mid-1980s. In 2015 they released Lost Time, a collection of covers including four songs by Big Joe Turner.

In live performance, Alvin assumed the role of emcee and storyteller. The brothers also worked Blasters tunes into the set list.

With Jimmie Dale Gilmore 
Alvin and Texas singer-songwriter Jimmie Dale Gilmore teamed on the 2018 album Downey to Lubbock (the title is a reference to where each man grew up).

As seen in his live performances with brother Phil, Alvin's stories between songs were a notable part of the stage shows with Gilmore and their supporting musicians.

In April 2022, Alvin announced his return to public performance after a grueling two-year battle with different forms of cancer that started in May 2020. He chose to do so with Gilmore, scheduling nine dates in California for late June and early July 2022.

Producer and collaborator 
Alvin has produced records for Chris Gaffney, Tom Russell, the Derailers, Big Sandy & His Fly-Rite Boys and Red Meat. He collaborated with the rockabilly musician Sonny Burgess. He has worked as a studio session musician accompanying Ramblin' Jack Elliott, Little Milton, Katy Moffatt, and Syd Straw.

Alvin has lent his guitar playing to other artists' albums over the years. For example, he played with the Gun Club and appeared on two songs from their 1984 album, The Las Vegas Story

Film 
Alvin appeared in the movies Border Radio and  Floundering and on the FX television series Justified in 2011. He also appeared in Streets of Fire, with the Blasters, in 1984.

Poetry and other writing 
Alvin has published two books of poetry: Any Rough Times Are Now Behind You and Nana, Big Joe & the Fourth of July. His poetry has appeared in Caffeine, the A.K.A. Review, Rattler, Asymptote and Enclitic and in the anthologies Nude Erections, Hit and Run Poets and Poetry Loves Poetry—An Anthology of Los Angeles Poets.

A collection of Alvin's writing called New Highway was scheduled for release in September 2022. Its subtitle -- Selected Lyrics, Poems, Prose, Essays, Eulogies and Blues -- described the scope of his work.

The Blasters discography 
(recordings with Dave Alvin as member)
American Music (1980)
The Blasters (1981)
Over There  (1982)
Non Fiction (1983)
 Hard Line (1985)
The Blasters Collection (1990)
Testament: The Complete Slash Recordings (2002)
Trouble bound (2002)
The Blasters Live: Going Home (2004)

The Blasters videography 
Streets of Fire (1984)
The Blasters Live: Going Home (2004)

X discography 
See How We Are (1986)

The Knitters discography 
Poor Little Critter on the Road (1985)
The Modern Sounds of the Knitters (2005)

Dave Alvin discography

Other contributions 
Lead guitar on "Believe" and "Amazing Disgrace" on Dollar Store's Dollar Store (Bloodshot Records BS-098) (2004)
Eklektikos Live (2005) – "Blackjack David"
Highway 61 Revisited Revisited, UNCUT (2005) – "Highway 61 Revisited"
The Lone Ranger: Wanted (2013) – "Lonesome Whistle"
 Produced and arranged Chris Gaffney's 1995 album "Loser's Paradise" released on Hightone Records.

Writings 
 Nana, Big Joe & the Fourth of July (Iliteratim 1986) 
 Any Rough Times Are Now Behind You (Incommunicado Press, 1996) 
 New Highway: Selected Lyrics, Poems, Prose, Essays, Eulogies and Blues (BMG Books, 2022)

References

Further reading 
 Stambler, Irwin & Lyndon. (2001) Folk & Blues: The Encyclopedia. 3rd ed. New York: St. Martin's Press. pp. 4–7.

External links 
 Official web site
 Dave Alvin profile at Music Match 
 Dave Alvin at NPR Music
 Dave Alvin collection at the Internet Archive's live music archive
 Dave Alvin's Instagram:

1955 births
Living people
20th-century American poets
American blues singers
American country rock singers
American country singer-songwriters
American folk singers
American rockabilly musicians
American rock guitarists
American male guitarists
American rock singers
California State University, Long Beach alumni
Grammy Award winners
Musicians from Downey, California
The Blasters members
The Knitters members
Singer-songwriters from California
X (American band) members
Guitarists from California
20th-century American guitarists
The Flesh Eaters members
Country musicians from California
20th-century American male musicians
Rhino Records artists
Yep Roc Records artists